The Regional Development Fund (DU) was a national development bank in Norway tasked with promoting regional development by counselling, loans and subsidies. The fund was established in 1961 and existed until 1993, when it was merged with the Industry Bank and the Industry Fund to form the Norwegian Industrial and Regional Development Fund. In 2004, the Norwegian Industrial and Regional Development Fund was merged with other agencies to form Innovation Norway.

The Regional Development Fund was headquartered in Oslo.

Directors of the Regional Development Fund
Reidar Carlsen (1961–78)
Leif Aune (1978–90)
Terje Stubberud (1991–92)

References

Defunct government agencies of Norway
Defunct banks of Norway
Government agencies established in 1961
Banks established in 1961
1961 establishments in Norway
Government agencies disestablished in 1993
Banks disestablished in 1993
1993 disestablishments in Norway
Organisations based in Oslo